Serhii Adamchuk (born February 7, 1990) is a Ukrainian kickboxer. A professional competitor since 2008, Adamchuk is a former Glory featherweight champion and three time featherweight title challenger.

Combat Press ranked him as a top ten featherweight kickboxer in the world between December 2015 and February 2017, June 2018 and March 2019, as well as between February 2021 and January 2022. He peaked at #2 in July 2016.

Kickboxing career

Glory

Early promotional career
Adamchuk made his Glory debut against the future lightweight champion Marat Grigorian at  Glory 22: Lille on June 5, 2015, in the reserve bout of the 2015 Lightweight Contender Tournament. Adamchuk stepped in on a days' notice, having been offered the opportunity to face Grigorian just 24 hours before the fight was supposed to take place. He won the bout by unanimous decision.

Adamchuk departed from Glory for his next bout, as he faced Kazuya Akimoto in the reserve match of the K-1 World GP 2015 -70kg Championship Tournament on July 4, 2015. He won the fight by split decision, with scores of 29–28, 29–30 and 30–29.

Adamchuk faced Anvar Boynazarov at Bellator MMA & Glory: Dynamite 1, a Glory and Bellator MMA cross-promotional event, on September 19, 2015. He won the fight by unanimous decision.

Glory Featherweight champion
These three victories earned Adamchuk the right to challenge Gabriel Varga for the Glory Featherweight Championship. The title bout was scheduled as the main event of the Glory 25: Milan Superfight Series, which took place on November 6, 2015. Adamchuk won the fight by unanimous decision.

Adamchuk made his first title defense against Mosab Amrani, who had earned his right to challenge for the championship by winning the 2015 Glory Featherweight Contender tournament, at Glory 28: Paris on March 12, 2016. He retained the title by unanimous decision.

Adamchuk made his second title defense in a rematch with Gabriel Varga, whom he had previously beaten to capture the title, Glory 32: Virginia on July 22, 2016. He lost the fight by majority decision, with scores of 48–47, 48–46 and 48–48.

Second Glory title challenge
Adamchuk faced Giga Chikadze in the semifinals of the 2016 Featherweight Contender Tournament, held at Glory 33: New Jersey on September 9, 2016. He lost the fight by split decision, with scores of 29–28, 29–28, 28–29. Adamchuk participated in the 2017 Featherweight Contender Tournament as well, which was held at Glory 39: Brussels on March 25, 2017, and was booked to face Nafi Bilalovski in the semifinal bout. Despite beating Bilalovski by unanimous decision, Adamchuk lost the final bout of the one-day tournament, as Petchpanomrung Kiatmookao beat him by split decision. 

Adamchuk next faced Dylan Salvador in a top contender bout at Glory 42: Paris on October 6, 2017. He won the fight by unanimous decision. Beating Salvador earned Adamchuk his second title challenge opportunity, as he was booked to face Robin van Roosmalen for the Glory Featherweight Championship at Glory 45: Amsterdam on September 30, 2017. He lost the fight by unanimous decision, with three judges scored the fight 48–47 for van Roosmalen, while the remaining two judges awarded him a 49–46 scorecard.

Third Glory title challenge
On March 3, 2018, it was revealed that Glory would hold the 2018 Featherweight Contender Tournament at Glory 53: Lille on May 12, 2018. Adamchuk was booked to face Azize Hlali in the tournament semifinals, while the other pairing saw Victor Pinto face Buray Bozaryilmaz. Adamchuk beat Hlali by unanimous decision, and advanced to the finals, where he faced Victor Pinto. Adamchuk won the tournament final by unanimous decision as well.

After extending his winning streak to three consecutive fights with a unanimous decision win against Anvar Boynazarov at Glory 56: Denver on August 10, 2018, Adamchuk was awarded the opportunity to challenge the Glory Featherweight champion Petchpanomrung Kiatmookao, who had previously beaten Adamchuk by split decision at Glory 39: Brussels. The title bout was scheduled as the main event of Glory 63: Houston on February 1, 2019. Petchpanomrung was more convincing in their second meeting, as he won the fight by unanimous decision, with all five judges awarding him a 50–45 scorecard.

Fourth Glory title challenge
After failing in his third title bid, Adamchuk was booked to face Kevin VanNostrand at Glory 67: Orlando on July 5, 2019. He lost the fight by unanimous decision. Adamchuk bounced back from this loss with a second-round technical knockout of Abraham Vidales at Glory 72: Chicago on November 23, 2019. It was his first stoppage victory since July 6, 2014. Adamchuk next faced Aleksei Ulianov at Glory Collision 2 on December 21, 2019. He won the fight by split decision.

Adamchuk was booked to challenge Petchpanomrung Kiatmookao for the Glory Featherweight Championship at Glory 75: Utrecht on February 29, 2020. It was Adamchuk's fourth Glory title challenge and the third time that he fought Petchpanomrung, having already lost to him on two previous occasions. Petchpanomrung won the fight by unanimous decision, with all five judges scoring the bout 49–45 in his favor.

Later featherweight career
Adamchuk faced Aleksei Ulianov in a rematch at Glory Collision 3 on October 23, 2021. He lost the fight by split decision.

Adamchuk faced the former RISE lightweight Kento Haraguchi at RISE WORLD SERIES / Glory Rivals 4 on December 25, 2022. He lost the fight by unanimous decision.

Titles and accomplishments

Amateur
World Association of Kickboxing Organizations
 2007 W.A.K.O. World Championships in Belgrade, Serbia  -60 kg (K-1 Rules)

Professional
Glory
 2018 Glory Featherweight Contender Tournament Winner
 2015 Glory Featherweight (-65 kg/143.3 lb) Champion (one time; one defense)
International Sport Karate Association
 2015 ISKA Super Welterweight(70 kg) Kickboxing European Champion

Kickboxing record

|-  style="background:#fbb;"
| 2022-12-25|| Loss ||align=left| Kento Haraguchi || RISE WORLD SERIES / Glory Rivals 4|| Tokyo, Japan || Decision (Unanimous) || 3 ||3:00
|- style="background:#fbb;"
| 2021-10-23 || Loss||align=left| Aleksei Ulianov || Glory Collision 3 || Arnhem, Netherlands ||  Decision (Split) || 3 || 3:00

|-  style="background:#Fbb;"
|  2020-02-29 || Loss || align="left" | Petchpanomrung Kiatmookao || Glory 75: Utrecht || Utrecht, Netherlands || Decision (Unanimous) || 5 || 3:00 
|-
! style=background:white colspan=9 |
|-  bgcolor="#cfc"
| 2019-12-21|| Win||align=left| Aleksei Ulianov || Glory Collision 2 || Arnhem, Netherlands || Decision (Split) || 3 || 3:00
|- style="background:#cfc;"
| 2019-11-23 || Win||align=left| Abraham Vidales || Glory 72: Chicago || Chicago, USA || TKO (Referee Stoppage) || 3 || 1:27
|-  style="background:#Fbb;"
| 2019-07-05 || Loss||align=left| Kevin VanNostrand || Glory 67: Orlando || Orlando, USA || Decision (Unanimous) || 3 || 3:00 
|- 
|-  style="background:#Fbb;"
| 2019-02-01 || Loss||align=left| Petchpanomrung Kiatmookao || Glory 63: Houston || Houston, USA || Decision (Unanimous) || 5 || 3:00 
|-
! style=background:white colspan=9 |
|-
|- style="background:#cfc;"
| 2018-08-10|| Win ||align=left| Anvar Boynazarov || Glory 56: Denver || Colorado || Decision (unanimous) || 3 || 3:00
|-  style="background:#cfc;"
| 2018-05-12 || Win||align=left| Victor Pinto || Glory 53: Lille Featherweight Contender Tournament, Final|| Lille, France || Decision (Unanimous) || 3 ||  3:00
|-
! style=background:white colspan=9 |
|-  style="background:#cfc;"
| 2018-05-12 || Win||align=left| Azize Hlali || Glory 53: Lille Featherweight Contender Tournament, Semi-Finals|| Lille, France || Decision (Unanimous) || 3 ||  3:00
|- 
|-  style="background:#Fbb;"
| 2017-09-30 || Loss||align=left| Robin van Roosmalen || Glory 45: Amsterdam || Amsterdam, Netherlands || Decision (Unanimous) || 5 || 3:00 
|-
! style=background:white colspan=9 |
|-  style="background:#cfc;"
| 2017-06-10 || Win ||align=left| Dylan Salvador || Glory 42: Paris|| Paris, France || Decision (unanimous)  || 3 || 3:00
|-
|-  style="background:#Fbb;"
| 2017-03-25 || Loss ||align=left| Petchpanomrung Kiatmookao || Glory 39: Brussels Featherweight Contender Tournament, Final|| Brussels, Belgium || Decision (Split) || 3 ||  3:00
|-  style="background:#cfc;"
| 2017-03-25 || Win||align=left| Nafi Bilalovski || Glory 39: Brussels Featherweight Contender Tournament, Semi-Finals|| Brussels, Belgium || Decision (Unanimous) || 3 ||  3:00
|-
|-  style="background:#Fbb;"
| 2016-09-09 || Loss ||align=left| Giga Chikadze || Glory 33: New Jersey Featherweight Contender Tournament, Semi-Finals || Trenton, New Jersey || Decision (split) || 3 || 3:00
|-
|-  style="background:#Fbb;"
| 2016-07-22 || Loss ||align=left| Gabriel Varga || Glory 32: Virginia|| Norfolk, Virginia || Decision (majority) || 5 || 3:00
|-
! style=background:white colspan=9 |
|-  style="background:#cfc;"
| 2016-04-16|| Win ||align=left| Mohammed El Mir|| Glory 29: Copenhagen || Copenhagen, Denmark|| Decision (Unanimous) || 3 || 3:00
|-  style="background:#cfc;"
| 2016-03-12 || Win ||align=left| Mosab Amrani || Glory 28: Paris|| Paris, France || Decision (Unanimous) || 5 || 3:00
|-
! style=background:white colspan=9 |
|-  style="background:#cfc;"
| 2015-11-06 || Win ||align=left| Gabriel Varga || Glory 25: Milan|| Monza, Italy || Decision (Unanimous) || 5 || 3:00
|-
! style=background:white colspan=9 |
|-  style="background:#cfc;"
| 2015-09-19|| Win ||align=left| Anvar Boynazarov || Bellator MMA & Glory: Dynamite 1 || San Jose, California, USA|| Decision (Unanimous) || 3 || 3:00
|-  style="background:#cfc;"
| 2015-07-04|| Win ||align=left| Kazuya Akimoto || K-1 World GP 2015 -70kg Championship Tournament, Reserve Match|| Tokyo, Japan|| Decision (Split) || 3 || 3:00
|-  style="background:#cfc;"
| 2015-06-05|| Win ||align=left| Marat Grigorian || Glory 22: Lille Lightweight Contender Tournament, Reserve Match|| Lille, France|| Decision (Unanimous) || 3 || 3:00
|-  style="background:#cfc;"
| 2015-04-11|| Win ||align=left| Dino Kacar || Choc des Mondes || Caudry, France|| Decision (Unanimous) || 3 || 3:00
|-
! style=background:white colspan=9 |
|-  style="background:#cfc;"
| 2014-07-06|| Win ||align=left| Lahoucine Idouche || Choc des Mondes|| France|| KO (Left Hook) || 3 || 1:29
|-  style="background:#Fbb;"
| 2013-05-29|| Loss||align=left| Deo Phetsangkhat || GPRO 12: 70 kg qualification tournament, Semi Finals || Russia||   ||  ||
|-  style="background:#cfc;"
| 2013-04-06|| Win||align=left| Artem Pashporin || GPRO 11 || Russia|| Decision  || 3 || 3:00
|-  style="background:#Fbb;"
| 2012-04-21|| Loss||align=left| Pawel Biszczak || GPRO 5: 76 kg final tournament, Quarter finals || Russia|| Decision  || 3 || 3:00
|-  style="background:#cfc;"
| 2012-03-03|| Win||align=left| Vladimir Tarasov || GPRO 4 || Ukraine|| Decision  || 3 || 3:00
|-
! style=background:white colspan=9 |
|-  style="background:#Fbb;"
| 2011-09-29|| Loss||align=left| Andrey Perepelkin || GPRO 2: 76 kg qualification tournament, Final  || Russia|| Decision  || 3 || 3:00
|-  style="background:#cfc;"
| 2011-09-29|| Win||align=left| Nikolai Bubnov || GPRO 2: 76 kg qualification tournament, Semi Finals || Russia|| Decision  || 3 || 3:00
|-  style="background:#cfc;"
| 2009-05-21|| Win||align=left| Sergey Lipinets || BARS: Russia vs Ukraine || Russia, Moscow|| KO  || 2 || 
|-  style="background:#cfc;"
| 2008-00-00|| Win||align=left| Yury Satsuk || PMMA: Kyiv mayor’s cup || Ukraine, Kyiv|| Decision  ||  || 
|-
| colspan=9 | Legend:    

|-  style="background:#fbb;"
| 2007-09-|| Loss ||align=left| Elbar Umarakaev || 2007 W.A.K.O. World Championships, Semi Finals || Belgrade, Serbia|| Decision  || 3 || 2:00
|-
! style=background:white colspan=9 |

|-  style="background:#cfc;"
| 2007-09-|| Win||align=left| Yury Dziatlau	|| 2007 W.A.K.O. World Championships, Quarter Finals || Belgrade, Serbia|| Decision  || 3 || 2:00
|-
| colspan=9 | Legend:

Mixed martial arts record
 

|-
|Win
|align=center|11–5
|Vlad Khalevich
|Decision (Unanimous)
|GEFC - Battle on the Gold Mountain
|
|align=center|2
|align=center|5:00
|Uzhgorod, Ukraine
|
|-
|Win
|align=center|10–5
|Roman Gusev
|Submission (Rear-Naked Choke)
|ECSF - Gladiator's Battle 2
|
|align=center|1
|align=center|0:20
|Kyiv, Ukraine
|
|-
|Win
|align=center|9–5
|Yagub Zamanov
|Decision (Unanimous)
|ECSF - Gladiator's Battle 2
|
|align=center|2
|align=center|5:00
|Kyiv, Ukraine
|
|-
|Loss
|align=center|8–5
|Vadim Khaitulov
|TKO (Corner Stoppage)
|M-1 Ukraine - Superfinal Grand Prix
|
|align=center|1
|align=center|4:17
|Kyiv, Ukraine
|
|-
|Win
|align=center|8–4
|Maciej Polok
|Decision (Majority)
|Polish MMA Championships Finals
|
|align=center|3
|align=center|5:00
|Voivodeship, Poland
|
|-
|Win
|align=center|7–4
|Yuri Saakyan
|Decision (Unanimous)
|M-1 Ukraine - Battle of Minsk
|
|align=center|2
|align=center|5:00
|Minsk, Belarus
|
|-
|Win
|align=center|6–4
|Sergey Sinkevich
|KO (Punch)
|M-1 Global - M-1 Ukraine European Battle
|
|align=center|2
|align=center|2:47
|Kyiv, Ukraine
|
|-
|Win
|align=center|5–4
|Vlad Cherbadzhi
|KO (Punch)
|M-1 Ukraine - International Club Grand Prix 1
|
|align=center|1
|align=center|4:49
|Kyiv, Ukraine
|
|-
|Win
|align=center|4–4
|Yuri Saakyan
|Decision (Unanimous)
|M-1 Selection Ukraine 2010 - The Finals
|
|align=center|3
|align=center|5:00
|Kyiv, Ukraine
|
|-
|Loss
|align=center|3–4
|Evgeni Khavilov
|Decision (Unanimous)
|M-1 Selection Ukraine 2010 - Round 6
|
|align=center|3
|align=center|5:00
|Kyiv, Ukraine
|
|-
|Win
|align=center|3–3
|Alexander Zinchenko
|Decision (Unanimous)
|M-1 Selection Ukraine 2010 - Clash of the Titans
|
|align=center|2
|align=center|5:00
|Kyiv, Ukraine
|
|-
|Loss
|align=center|2–3
|Mairbek Taisumov
|Submission (Rear-Naked Choke)
|M-1 Selection 2010 - Eastern Europe Finals
|
|align=center|1
|align=center|3:04
|Moscow, Russia
|
|-
|Win
|align=center|2–2
|Eduard Pestrak
|TKO (Punches)
|M-1 Selection Ukraine 2010 - Round 2
|
|align=center|1
|align=center|0:44
|Kyiv, Ukraine
|
|-
|Win
|align=center|1–2
|Shota Akulashvili
|TKO (Corner Stoppage)
|M-1 Ukraine - 2009 Selections 4
|
|align=center|1
|align=center|5:00
|Kyiv, Ukraine
|
|-
|Loss
|align=center|0–2
|Mikhail Lysyuchenko
|Decision (Unanimous)
|M-1 Ukraine - 2009 Selections 1
|
|align=center|2
|align=center|5:00
|Kyiv, Ukraine
|
|-
|Loss
|align=center|0–1
|Kirill Krikunov
|Decision (Unanimous)
|M-1 Ukraine - Lviv Open Cup
|
|align=center|2
|align=center|5:00
|Lviv, Ukraine
|
|-
|}

See also
List of male kickboxers

References

External links
 Serhiy Adamchuk at Glory Kickboxing

Living people
1990 births
Sportspeople  from Kryvyi Rih
Ukrainian male kickboxers
Ukrainian male mixed martial artists
Mixed martial artists utilizing kickboxing
Mixed martial artists utilizing sambo
Ukrainian sambo practitioners
Glory kickboxers
Sportspeople from Dnipropetrovsk Oblast